The 2009 County Championship season, known as the LV County Championship for sponsorship reasons, was the 110th County Championship season. It was contested through two divisions: Division One and Division Two. Each team played all the others in their division both home and away. The top two teams from Division Two were promoted to the first division for the 2010 season, while the bottom two sides from Division 1 were relegated.

Durham County Cricket Club won the Championship for the second consecutive season. Worcestershire and Sussex were relegated from Division One, with Kent and Essex promoted in their place.

Teams

Standings
Fourteen points were awarded for each win, four points were awarded for a draw or abandonment. Defeats scored no points. Teams were awarded bonus points during the first 130 overs of their first innings; one bowling point for every three wickets taken (up to three points available), and one batting point gained when teams reached 200, 250, 300, 350 and 400 runs (up to five points available).

 Pos = Position, Pld = Played, W = Wins, L = Losses, D = Draws, T = Ties, A = Abandonments, Bat = Batting points, Bowl = Bowling points, Pen = Penalty points, Pts = Points.

Division One

Division Two

References

External links 
 Cricinfo

County Championship seasons
County Championship